José Latour (born April 24, 1940 in Havana, Cuba) is a Cuban crime fiction writer.

His first three novels (Preludio a la Noche, Medianoche Enemiga and Fauna Noctura), set in pre-revolutionary Havana, were published in 1982, 1986 and 1989. The fourth (Choque de Leyendas), was released in 1998.

In 1994 Latour submitted his new book The Fool to his Cuban publisher. Based on a real-life case of corruption in the ministries of the Interior and the Armed Forces, the book was considered counterrevolutionary and its author labeled an "enemy of the people."  Certain that he would never be published in Cuba again as long as all publishing houses were state-owned, Latour took a shot at writing in English.

His first novel in that language, Outcast, was published in the U.S., Japan, five Western European countries and Brazil. It got flattering reviews and was nominated for an Edgar. Since then, he has penned Havana Best Friends (2002), Havana World Series (2003), Comrades in Miami (2005) and The Young Englishman (2006, still unpublished). His sole non-fiction book is Postcommunist CUBA Poscomunista, a bilingual essay.

Personal
Seeking creative freedom and fearing dictatorial repression, the author and his family moved to Spain in August 2002 and to Canada in September 2004; as of 2014, they reside in Toronto.

References

External links
 
 
Jose Latour, Man of Mystery — And Action
Special Relationship, Cuban Style - An interview with JOSE LATOUR

Cuban male novelists
Canadian mystery writers
Cuban emigrants to Spain
Living people
Place of birth missing (living people)
Cuban emigrants to Canada
Writers from Havana
1940 births
Exophonic writers